The Ford Mustang is a series of American automobiles manufactured by Ford. In continuous production since 1964, the Mustang is currently the longest-produced Ford car nameplate. Currently in its sixth generation, it is the fifth-best selling Ford car nameplate. The namesake of the "pony car" automobile segment, the Mustang was developed as a highly styled line of sporty coupes and convertibles derived from existing model lines, initially distinguished by "long hood, short deck" proportions.

Originally predicted to sell 100,000 vehicles yearly, the 1965 Mustang became the most successful vehicle launch since the 1927 Model A. Introduced on April 17, 1964 (16 days after the Plymouth Barracuda), over 400,000 units were sold in its first year; the one-millionth Mustang was sold within two years of its launch. In August 2018, Ford produced the 10-millionth Mustang; matching the first 1965 Mustang, the vehicle was a 2019 Wimbledon White convertible with a V8 engine.

The success of the Mustang launch led to multiple competitors from other American manufacturers, including the Chevrolet Camaro and Pontiac Firebird (1967), AMC Javelin (1968), and Dodge Challenger (1970). The Mustang also had an effect on designs of coupes worldwide, leading to the marketing of the Toyota Celica and Ford Capri in the United States (the latter, by Lincoln-Mercury). The Mercury Cougar was launched in 1967 as a unique-bodied higher-trim alternative to the Mustang; during the 1970s, it included more features and was marketed as a personal luxury car.

From 1965 until 2004, the Mustang shared chassis commonality with other Ford model lines, staying rear-wheel-drive throughout its production. From 1965 to 1973, the Mustang was derived from the 1960 Ford Falcon compact. From 1974 until 1978, the Mustang (denoted Mustang II) was a longer-wheelbase version of the Ford Pinto. From 1979 until 2004, the Mustang shared its Fox platform chassis with 14 other Ford vehicles (becoming the final one to use the Fox architecture). Since 2005, Ford has produced two generations of the Mustang, each using a distinct platform unique to the model line.

Through its production, multiple nameplates have been associated with the Ford Mustang series, including GT, Mach 1, Boss 302/429, Cobra (separate from Shelby Cobra), and Bullitt, along with "5.0" fender badging (denoting 4.9 L OHV or 5.0 L DOHC V8 engines).

Name 
Executive stylist John Najjar, who was a fan of the World War II P-51 Mustang fighter plane, is credited by Ford with suggesting the name. Najjar co-designed the first prototype of the Ford Mustang known as the "Ford Mustang I" in 1961, working jointly with fellow Ford stylist Philip T. Clark. The Mustang I made its formal debut at the United States Grand Prix in Watkins Glen, New York, on October 7, 1962, where test driver and contemporary Formula One race driver Dan Gurney lapped the track in a demonstration using the second "race" prototype.

An alternative view was that Robert J. Eggert, Ford Division market research manager, first suggested the Mustang name. Eggert, a breeder of quarterhorses, received a birthday present from his wife of the book, The Mustangs by J. Frank Dobie in 1960. Later, the book's title gave him the idea of adding the "Mustang" name for Ford's new concept car. The designer preferred Cougar (early styling bucks can be seen wearing a Cougar grille emblem) or Torino (an advertising campaign using the Torino name was actually prepared), while Henry Ford II wanted T-bird II. As the person responsible for Ford's research on potential names, Eggert added "Mustang" to the list to be tested by focus groups; "Mustang", by a wide margin, came out on top under the heading: "Suitability as Name for the Special Car". The name could not be used in Germany, however, because it was owned by Krupp, which had manufactured trucks between 1951 and 1964 with the name "Mustang". Kreidler, a manufacturer of mopeds, also used the name, so Mustangs were sold in Germany as "T-5s" until December 1978.

First generation (1965–1973) 

Lee Iacocca's assistant general manager and chief engineer, Donald N. Frey was the head engineer for the T-5 project—supervising the overall development of the car in a record 18 months—while Iacocca himself championed the project as Ford Division general manager. The T-5 prototype was a two-seat, mid-mounted engine roadster. This vehicle employed the German Ford Taunus V4 engine.

The original 1962 Ford Mustang I two-seater concept car had evolved into the 1963 Mustang II four-seater concept car which Ford used to pretest how the public would take interest in the first production Mustang. The 1963 Mustang II concept car was designed with a variation of the production model's front and rear ends with a roof that was  lower. It was originally based on the platform of the second-generation North American Ford Falcon, a compact car. Gale Halderman's side view design is the basis for the first clay model.

Non-traditional (1964½) introduction 

The Ford Mustang began production five months before the normal start of the 1965 production year. The early production versions are often referred to as "1964½ models" but all Mustangs were advertised, VIN coded and titled by Ford as 1965 models, though minor design updates in August 1964 at the formal start of the 1965 production year contribute to tracking 1964 production data separately from 1965 data (see data below). with production beginning in Dearborn, Michigan, on March 9, 1964; the new car was, on 14 April 1964, first sold to the public, before it was even introduced on April 17, 1964, at the New York World's Fair. Body styles available included a two-door hardtop and convertible, with a "2+2" fastback added to the line in September 1964. A Wimbledon White (paint code P) convertible with red interior was used as product placement when the James Bond movie Goldfinger was released September 17, 1964, at its London premiere, where Bond girl Tilly Masterson was in a spirited chase with James driving an Aston Martin DB5 in the Swiss Alps. A Tropical Turquoise (paint code O) coupe was again used in the next film Thunderball at its Tokyo premiere 9 December 1965 with Bond girl Fiona Volpe as she drives James to meet the villain Emilio Largo at his compound at a very high speed across The Bahamas.

Favorable publicity articles appeared in 2,600 newspapers the next morning, the day the car was "officially" revealed. A four-seat car with full space for the front bucket seats and a rear bench seat was standard. A "fastback 2+2", first manufactured on August 17, 1964, enclosed the trunk space under a sweeping exterior line similar to the second series Corvette Sting Ray and European sports cars such as the Jaguar E-Type coupe.

Price and record-breaking sales 

Many (if not most) of the interior, chassis, suspension, and drivetrain components were derived from those used on Ford's Falcon and Fairlane. This use of common components also shortened the learning curve for assembly and repair workers, while at the same time allowing dealers to pick up the Mustang without also having to invest in additional spare parts inventory to support the new car line. Original sales forecasts projected less than 100,000 units for the first year. This mark was surpassed in three months from rollout. Another 318,000 would be sold during the model year (a record), and in its first eighteen months, more than one million Mustangs were built.

Upgrades 
The rush into production included some unusual quirks, such as the horn ring bearing the 'Ford Falcon' logo covered by a trim ring with a 'Ford Mustang' logo. These characteristics made enough difference to warrant designation of the 121,538 early versions as "1964½" Mustangs, a distinction that has endured with purists.

Ford's designers began drawing up larger versions even as the original was achieving sales success, and while "Iacocca later complained about the Mustang's growth, he did oversee the 1967 redesign." From 1967 until 1973, the Mustang got bigger but not necessarily more powerful. The Mustang was facelifted, giving the Mustang a more massive look overall and allowing a big block engine to be offered for the first time. Front and rear end styling was more pronounced, and the "twin cove" instrument panel offered a thicker crash pad and larger gauges. Hardtop, fastback, and convertible body styles continued as before. Around this time, the Mustang was paired with a Mercury variant, called the Cougar, which used its own styling cues, such as a "prowling cat" logo and hidden quad headlamps. New safety regulations by the U.S. National Highway Traffic Safety Administration (NHTSA) for 1967 included an energy-absorbing steering column and wheel, 4-way emergency flashers, and a dual-circuit hydraulic braking system, and softer interior knobs. The 1968 models received revised side scoops, steering wheel, and gasoline caps. Side marker lights were also added that year, and cars built after January 1, 1968, included shoulder belts for both front seats on coupes. The 1968 models also introduced a new  V8 engine, designed with Federal emissions regulations in mind.

The 1969 restyle "added more heft to the body as width and length again increased. Weight went up markedly too." Due to the larger body and revised front end styling, the 1969 models (but less so in 1970) had a notable aggressive stance. The 1969 models featured "quad headlamps" which disappeared to make way for a wider grille and a return to standard headlamps in the 1970 models. This switch back to standard headlamps was an attempt to tame the aggressive styling of the 1969 model, which some felt was too extreme and hurt sales, but 1969 production exceeded the 1970 total.

Models 
Starting in 1969, to aid sales and continue the winning formula of the Mustang, a variety of new performance and decorative options became available, including functional (and non-functional) air scoops, cable and pin hood tie-downs, and both wing and chin spoilers. Additionally, a variety of performance packages were introduced that included the Mach 1, the Boss 302, and Boss 429. The two Boss models were to homologate the engines for racing. The 1969 Mustang was the last year for the GT option (although it did return on the third-generation Mustang for the 1982 model year). A fourth model available only as a hardtop, the Grandé, saw success starting in 1969 with its soft ride, "luxurious" trim,  of extra sound deadening, and simulated wood trim.

Sales fluctuation 
Developed under the watch of S. "Bunkie" Knudsen, Mustang evolved "from speed and power" to the growing consumer demand for bigger and heavier "luxury" type designs. "The result was the styling misadventures of 1971–73 ...the Mustang grew fat and lazy," "Ford was out of the go-fast business almost entirely by 1971." "This was the last major restyling of the first-generation Mustang." "The restyling also sought to create the illusion that the cars were even larger." Performance decreased with sales continuing to decrease as consumers switched to the smaller Pintos and Mavericks. A displeased Iacocca summed up later: "The Mustang market never left us, we left it."

Second generation (1974–1978) 

Iacocca, who had been one of the forces behind the original Mustang, became president of Ford Motor Company in 1970, and ordered a smaller, more fuel-efficient Mustang for 1974. Initially, it was to be based on the Ford Maverick, but ultimately was based on the Ford Pinto subcompact.

The new model, called the "Mustang II", was introduced on September 21, 1973, two months before the first 1973 oil crisis, and its reduced size allowed it to compete against successful imported sports coupes such as the Japanese Datsun 240Z, Toyota Celica and the European Ford Capri (then Ford-built in Germany and Britain, sold in U.S. by Mercury as a captive import car). First-year sales were 385,993 cars, compared with the original Mustang's twelve-month sales record of 418,812. Ultimately, the Mustang II was an early example of downsizing that would take place among Detroit's Big Three during the "malaise era".

Iacocca wanted the new car, which returned the Mustang to its 1965 model year predecessor in size, shape, and overall styling, to be finished to a high standard, saying it should be "a little jewel". Not only was it smaller than the original car, but it was also heavier, owing to the addition of equipment needed to meet new U.S. emission and safety regulations. Performance was reduced, and despite the car's new handling and engineering features the galloping mustang emblem "became a less muscular steed that seemed to be cantering".

Engines for the 1974 models included the venerable 2.3 L I4 from the Pinto and the 2.8 L Cologne V6 from the Mercury Capri. The 1975 model year reintroduced the  Windsor V8 that was only available with the C-4 automatic transmission, power brakes, and power steering. This continued through production's end in 1978. Other transmissions were the RAD four-speed with unique gearing for all three engines, and the C-3 automatic behind the 2.3 L and 2.8 L. The "5.0 L" marketing designation was not applied until the 1978 King Cobra model. All -equipped Mustang IIs, except the King Cobras, received updated versions of the classic Ford "V8" emblem on each front fender.

The car was available in coupe and hatchback versions, including a "luxury" Ghia model designed by Ford's recently acquired Ghia of Italy. The coupe was marketed as a "hardtop" but actually had a thin "B" pillar and rear quarter windows that did not roll down. All Mustangs in this generation did feature frameless door glass, however. The "Ghia" featured a thickly padded vinyl roof and smaller rear quarter windows, giving a more formal look. 1974 models were: hardtop, hatchback, Mach 1, and Ghia. Changes introduced for 1975 included the availability of an "MPG" model which had a different rear axle ratio for better fuel economy. 1976 added the "Stallion" trim package. The Mach 1 remained through the life cycle 1974–1978. Other changes in appearance and performance came with a "Cobra II" version in 1976–1978 and a "King Cobra" in 1978 of which around 4,972 were built. The 1977–1978 hatchback models in all trim levels were now available with the T-top roof option, which included a leatherette storage bag that clipped to the top of the spare tire hump.

Third generation (1979–1993) 

The 1979 Mustang was based on the larger Fox platform (initially developed for the 1978 Ford Fairmont and Mercury Zephyr). The larger body with an increased wheelbase yielded more interior space for four passengers, especially in the back seat, as well as a larger capacity trunk and a bigger engine bay.

Body styles included a coupe (or notchback), hatchback, and convertible. Available trim levels included an unnamed base model (1979–1981), Ghia (1979–1981), Cobra (1979–1981, 1993), L (1982–1984), GL (1982–1983), GLX (1982–1983), GT (1982–1993), Turbo GT (1983–1984), LX (1984–1993), GT-350 20th anniversary edition (1984), SVO (1984–1986) and Cobra R (1993).

Engines and drivetrains carried over from the Mustang II including the 2.3 L I4, 2.8 L V6, and 4.9 L V8 engines. A troublesome 2.3 L turbocharged I4 was available during initial production startup and then reappeared after undergoing improvements for the mid-year introduction of the 1983 turbo GT. The 2.8 L V6, in short supply, was replaced with a 3.3 L I6 engine during the 1979-model year. That engine was ultimately replaced with a new 3.8 L V6 for 1983. The  V8 was suspended after 1979 and replaced with a smaller, 4.2 L V8 which was dropped in favor of the high output  V8 for 1982.

From 1979 to 1986, the Capri was domestically produced as a Mercury-badged version of the Mustang, using a few of its own styling cues.

The third-generation Mustang had two different front-end styles. From 1979 to 1986, the front end was angled back using four rectangular headlights, known by enthusiasts as "four eyes". The front end was restyled for 1987 to 1993 model years to reflect the contemporary, rounded-off "aero" style of the Ford Taurus using flush-composite headlamps and a smooth grille-less nose.

The Mustang was selected as the 1979 Official Indianapolis 500 Pace Car with replicas sold to the public. Its special body-appearance parts were adapted by the Cobra package for 1980–81.

1982 marked the return of the Mustang GT (replacing the Cobra) which used a specially-modified high-output  engine.

1983 saw the return of the Mustang convertible after a nine-year absence. The front fascias of all Mustangs were restyled, featuring new grilles, sporting "blue oval" Ford emblems for the first time.

1984 introduced the high-performance Mustang SVO, which featured a 2.3 L turbocharged and intercooled four-cylinder engine and unique bodywork.

The Mustang celebrated its 20th anniversary with a special GT350 model in white with red interior and red lower-bodyside rocker stripes. 1985 Mustangs received another front-fascia restyle.

In response to poor sales and escalating fuel prices during the early 1980s, a new Mustang was in development. It was to be a variant of the Mazda MX-6 assembled at AutoAlliance International in Flat Rock, Michigan. Enthusiasts wrote to Ford objecting to the proposed change to a front-wheel drive, Japanese-designed Mustang without a V8 option. The result was the continuation of the existing Mustang while the Mazda MX-6 variant had a last-minute name change from Mustang to Probe and was released as a 1989 model.

The Mustang received a major restyling for 1987, including the interior, which carried it through the end of the 1993 model year.

Under the newly established Ford SVT division, the 1993 Ford Mustang SVT Cobra and Cobra R were added as special, high-performance models.

Fourth generation (1994–2004) 

In November 1993, the Mustang debuted its first major redesign in fifteen years. Code-named "SN-95" by the automaker, it was based on an updated version of the rear-wheel drive Fox platform called "Fox-4." The new styling by Patrick Schiavone incorporated several styling cues from earlier Mustangs. For the first time since its introduction 1964, a notchback coupe model was not available. The door windows on the coupe were once again frameless; however, the car had a fixed "B" pillar and rear windows.

Though initially used in the 1994 and 1995 Mustang GTS, GT and Cobra, Ford retired the 302 cid pushrod small-block V8 after nearly 30 years of use, replacing it with the newer Modular  SOHC V8 in the 1996 Mustang GT.

For 1999, the Mustang was reskinned with Ford's New Edge styling theme with sharper contours, larger wheel arches, and creases in its bodywork, but its basic proportions, interior design, and chassis remained the same as the previous model. The Mustang's powertrains were carried over for 1999, but benefited from new improvements. In 2001, the 3.8 L was increased to 193 bhp. There were also three alternate models offered in this generation: the 2001 Bullitt, the 2003 and 2004 Mach 1, as well as the  1999 and 2001, and  2003 and 2004 Cobra.

Ford Australia
This generation was sold in Australia between 2001 and 2002, to compete against the Holden Monaro (which eventually became the basis for the reborn Pontiac GTO). Due to the fact that the Mustang was never designed for right-hand-drive, Ford Australia contracted Tickford Vehicle Engineering to convert 250 Mustangs and modify them to meet Australian Design Rules per year. Sales did not meet expectations, due in part to a high selling price. In total, just 377 Mustangs were sold in Australia between 2001 and 2003. For promotional purposes, Ford Racing Australia also built a Mustang V10 convertible, which was powered by a Ford Modular 6.8 L V10 engine from the American F truck series but fitted with an Australian-made Sprintex supercharger.

Fifth generation (2005–2014) 

Ford introduced a re-designed 2005 model year Mustang at the 2004 North American International Auto Show, codenamed "S-197", that was based on the new D2C platform. Developed under the direction of chief engineer Hau Thai-Tang, a veteran engineer for Ford's IndyCar program under Mario Andretti, and exterior styling designer Sid Ramnarace, the fifth-generation Mustang's styling echoes the fastback Mustang models of the late-1960s. Ford's senior vice president of design, J Mays, called it "retro-futurism". The fifth-generation Mustang was manufactured at the Flat Rock Assembly Plant in Flat Rock, Michigan.

For the 2005 to 2010 production years, the base model was powered by a  cast-iron block 4.0 L SOHC V6, while the GT used an aluminum block 4.6 L SOHC three-valve Modular V8 with variable camshaft timing (VCT) that produced . Base models had Tremec T5 five-speed manual transmissions with Ford's 5R55S five-speed automatic being optional. Automatic GTs also featured this, but manual GTs had the Tremec TR-3650 five-speeds.

The 2010 model year Mustang was released in the spring of 2009 with a redesigned exterior — which included sequential LED taillights — and a reduced drag coefficient of 4% on base models and 7% on GT models. Other mechanical features included new spring rates and dampers, traction and stability control system standard on all models, and new wheel sizes.

Engines were revised for 2011, and transmission options included the Getrag-Ford MT82 six-speed manual or the 6R80 six-speed automatic based on the ZF 6HP26 transmission, licensed for production by Ford. Electric power steering replaced the conventional hydraulic version. A new  aluminum block V6 engine weighed  less than the previous version. The 3.7 L engine came with a new dual exhaust. GT models included 32-valve 5.0 L engine (4,951cc or 302.13 cu. in) (also referred to as the "Coyote") producing 412 hp and 390 ft-lbs of torque. Brembo brakes were optional along with 19-inch wheels and performance tires.

The Shelby GT500's 5.4 L supercharged V8 block is made of aluminum making it  lighter than the iron units in previous years.

For 2012, a new Mustang Boss 302 version was introduced. A "Laguna Seca" edition was also available, which offered additional body bracing, the replacement of the rear seat with a steel "X-brace" for stiffening, and other powertrain and handling enhancements.

In the second quarter of 2012, Ford launched an update to the Mustang line as an early 2013 model. The Shelby GT500 had a new 5.8 L supercharged V8 producing . The Shelby and Boss engines came with a six-speed manual transmission. The GT and V6 models revised styling incorporated the grille and air intakes from the 2010–2012 GT500s. The decklid received a black cosmetic panel on all trim levels.

Sixth generation (2015–present) 

The sixth generation Mustang was unveiled on December 5, 2013, in Dearborn, Michigan; New York, New York; Los Angeles, California; Barcelona, Spain; Shanghai, China; and Sydney, Australia. The internal project code name is S-550.

Changes include a body widened by 1.5 inches and lowered 1.4 inches, a trapezoidal grille, and a 2.75-inch lower decklid, as well as new colors. The passenger volume is increased to 84.5 cubic feet, the wheelbase is still 8 ft. 11.1 in. (107.1 in.), and three engine options are available: a newly developed 2.3 L EcoBoost 310 hp four-cylinder introduced to reach high tariff global markets like China, 3.7 L 300 hp V6, or 5.0 L Coyote 435 hp V8, with either a Getrag six-speed manual or six-speed automatic transmission with paddle shifters.

A new independent rear suspension (IRS) system was developed specifically for the new model. It also became the first version factory designed as a right hand drive export model to be sold overseas through Ford new car dealerships in right hand drive markets. 

In February 2015, the Mustang earned a five-star rating from the National Highway Traffic Safety Administration (NHTSA) for front, side, and rollover crash protection.

In May 2015, Ford issued a recall involving 19,486 of the 2015 Ford Mustang with the 2.3 L EcoBoost turbocharged four-cylinder engine with a production date between February 14, 2014, and February 10, 2015, that were built at the Flat Rock Assembly Plant. As of June 2015, 1 million Mustangs (between 2005 and 2011) and GTs (between 2005 and 2006) were affected by a recall of airbags made by Takata Corporation. This was after Takata announced that it was recalling 33.8 million vehicles in the U.S. for airbags that could explode and send metal pieces flying at drivers and passengers.

Euro NCAP crash-tested the left hand drive (LHD) European version of the 2017 Mustang which received only two stars due to the lack of auto safety features such as lane assist and auto braking. Euro NCAP also pointed to insufficient pressure of the Airbag resulting in the driver's head hitting the steering wheel. In the full-width test, the rear passenger slipped under the seatbelt.

The 2018 model year Mustang was released in the third quarter of 2017 in North America and by 2018 globally. It featured a minor redesign to the exterior. The 2018 Mustang engine line up was revised. The automatic transmission in both engines is now a ten-speed Ford 10R80. In January 2018, Ford displayed a prototype of the special edition 2018 Bullitt model, to be released in the summer; this vehicle commemorated the 50th anniversary of the movie Bullitt that helped attract interest in the marque.

For the 2019 model year, Ford revised many components on the 2019 Shelby GT350 including stickier Michelin Pilot Sport Cup 2 tires along with steering and suspension components.

The 2020 model year saw the re-introduction of the GT500. The 2020 GT500 includes a hand-built 5.2-liter "Predator" aluminum-alloy V8 engine with a 2.65-liter roots-type supercharger. The GT350 was discontinued at the end of the 2020 model year.

For the 2021 model year, Ford re-introduced the Mach 1 after a 17-year hiatus. The Mach 1 also utilizes parts from the GT500, including the rear axle cooling system, rear toe link, and rear diffuser.

Seventh generation (2024)

Ford introduced the seventh-generation Mustang at the 2022 Detroit Auto Show on September 14, in a special event called "The Stampede".

Mustang Mach-E

On November 17, 2019, Ford announced the Ford Mustang Mach-E. Unrelated to any of the pony car Mustang versions, it is an electric crossover with rear-wheel and all-wheel drive. It has  of range and an updated Ford Sync system with a 15.5 inch display. The Mustang Mach-E comes in several different trims including First Edition, Select, Premium, California Route 1, and GT. The Mach-E Mustang also offers "regular and extended-range batteries".

Racing 

The Mustang made its first public appearance on a racetrack as pace car for the 1964 Indianapolis 500.

The same year, Mustangs won first and second in class at the Tour de France international rally.

In 1969, modified versions of the 428 Mach 1, Boss 429 and Boss 302 took 295 United States Auto Club-certified records at Bonneville Salt Flats. Drivers were Mickey Thompson, Danny Ongais, Ray Brock, and Bob Ottum.

Drag racing 
The car's American competition debut, also in 1964, was in drag racing, where private individuals and dealer-sponsored teams campaigned Mustangs powered by  V8s.

In late 1964, Ford contracted Holman & Moody to prepare ten 427-powered Mustangs to contest the National Hot Rod Association's (NHRA) A/Factory Experimental class in the 1965 drag racing season. Five of these special Mustangs made their competition debut at the 1965 NHRA Winternationals, where they qualified in the factory stock eliminator class. The car driven by Bill Lawton won the class.

A decade later Bob Glidden won the Mustang's first NHRA pro stock title.

Rickie Smith's Motorcraft Mustang won the International Hot Rod Association pro stock world championship.

In 2002 John Force broke his own NHRA drag racing record by winning his 12th national championship in his Ford Mustang funny car, Force beat that record again in 2006, becoming the first-ever 14-time champion, driving a Mustang.

Circuit racing 
Early Mustangs also proved successful in road racing. The GT 350 R, the race version of the Shelby GT 350, won five of the Sports Car Club of America's (SCCA) six divisions in 1965. Drivers were Jerry Titus, Bob Johnson and Mark Donohue, and Titus won the (SCCA) B-Production national championship. The GT 350s won the B-Production title again in 1966 and 1967. They also won the 1966 manufacturers' championship in the inaugural SCCA Trans-Am series, and repeated the win the following year.

In 1970, Mustang won the SCCA series manufacturers' championship again, with Parnelli Jones and George Follmer driving for car owner/builder Bud Moore and crew chief Lanky Foushee. Jones won the "unofficial" drivers' title.

In 1975 Ron Smaldone's Mustang became the first-ever American car to win the Showroom Stock national championship in SCCA road racing.

Mustangs competed in the IMSA GTO class, with wins in 1984 and 1985. In 1985 John Jones won the 1985 GTO drivers' championship; Wally Dallenbach Jr., John Jones and Doc Bundy won the GTO class at the Daytona 24 Hours; and Ford won its first manufacturers' championship in road racing since 1970. Three class wins went to Lynn St. James, the first woman to win in the series.

1986 brought eight more GTO wins and another manufacturers' title. Scott Pruett won the drivers' championship. The GT Endurance Championship also went to Ford.

In 1987 Saleen Autosport Mustangs driven by Steve Saleen and Rick Titus won the SCCA Escort Endurance SSGT championship, and in International Motor Sports Association (IMSA) racing a Mustang again won the GTO class in the Daytona 24 Hours. In 1989, the Mustang won Ford its first Trans-Am manufacturers' title since 1970, with Dorsey Schroeder winning the drivers' championship.

In 1997, Tommy Kendall's Roush-prepared Mustang won a record 11 consecutive races in Trans-Am to secure his third straight driver's championship.

Mustangs compete in the SCCA World Challenge, with Brandon Davis winning the 2009 GT driver's championship. Mustangs competed in the now-defunct Grand-Am Road Racing Ford Racing Mustang Challenge for the Miller Cup series.

Ford won championships in the Grand-Am Road Racing Continental Tire Sports Car Challenge for the 2005, 2008, and 2009 seasons with the Mustang FR500C and GT models. In 2004, Ford Racing retained Multimatic Motorsports to design, engineer, build and race the Mustang FR500C turn-key race car. In 2005, Scott Maxwell and David Empringham took the driver's title. In 2010, the next-generation Mustang race car was known as the Boss 302R. It took its maiden victory at Barber Motorsports Park in early 2011, with drivers Scott Maxwell and Joe Foster.

In 2012, Jack Roush Jr and Billy Johnson won the Continental Tire Sports Car Challenge race at the Daytona International Speedway opening race of the 50th Anniversary Rolex 24 At Daytona weekend in a Mustang Boss 302R.

In 2016, Multimatic Motorsports won the IMSA CTSCC drivers' and manufacturers' titles with the S550-based Shelby GT350R-C, driven by Scott Maxwell and Billy Johnson.

Stock car racing 

Dick Trickle won 67 short-track oval feature races in 1972, a US national record for wins in a single season.

In 2010 the Ford Mustang became Ford's Car of Tomorrow for the NASCAR Nationwide Series with full-time racing of the Mustang beginning in 2011. This opened a new chapter in both the Mustang's history and Ford's history. NASCAR insiders expected to see Mustang racing in NASCAR Sprint Cup by 2014 (the model's 50th anniversary). The NASCAR vehicles are not based on production models but are a silhouette racing car with decals that give them a superficial resemblance to road cars. Carl Edwards won the first-ever race with a NASCAR-prepped Mustang on April 8, 2011, at the Texas Motor Speedway.

Ford Mustangs have also raced in the NASCAR Xfinity Series since 2010.

Ford Mustangs are driven in the NASCAR Whelen Euro Series also.

Ford Mustangs have been track-raced in the NASCAR Cup Series since 2019, replacing the discontinued Ford Fusion.

Drifting 
Mustangs have competed at the Formula Drift and D1 Grand Prix series, most notably by American driver Vaughn Gittin Jr.

Brazilian Driver Diego Higa won the Netflix Hyperdrive Series in 2019 in a 2006 Ford Mustang V8.

Europe 

Ford Mustangs compete in the FIA GT3 European Championship, and compete in the GT4 European Cup and other sports car races such as the 24 Hours of Spa. The Marc VDS Racing Team was developing the GT3 spec Mustang since 2010.

Australia 
The Ford Mustang was announced as the replacement for the Ford Falcon FG X in the 2019 Supercars Championship, which is being contested in Australia and New Zealand. The Mustang placed first in the first race of the year with Scott McLaughlin winning for DJR Team Penske.

Awards 

The 1965 Mustang won the Tiffany Gold Medal for excellence in American design, the first automobile ever to do so.

The Mustang was on the Car and Driver Ten Best list in 1983, 1987, 1988, 2005, 2006, 2011, and 2016. It won the Motor Trend Car of the Year award in 1974 and 1994.

Sales

Mustang Owner's Museum
In May 2016, the Mustang Owner's Museum was announced, with an official opening in Concord, North Carolina on April 17, 2019; the fifty-fifth anniversary.

In popular culture 

The Ford Mustang has been featured in numerous media. Effective product placement allowed the car to reach "celebrity status in the 1960s." In particular, "movie glamour" assisted in establishing a positive association with the Mustang. The following are a few notable cases where embedded marketing influenced the sales or other tangible aspect of the vehicle:
 The 1964 movie The Troops of St. Tropez, was the Ford Mustang's first appearance in a movie. "Contrary to popular belief, the Ford Mustang did not make its cinematic debut in the classic James Bond film Goldfinger. On September 9, 1964, Nicole Cruchot cruised around in a Poppy Red 1964.5 Mustang convertible in the French comedy Le Gendarme de Saint-Tropez. Known to American audiences as The Troops of St. Tropez, Cruchot’s character, Geneviève Grad, holds the distinct honor of being the first person to drive a Ford Mustang on the silver screen."
 The 1964 movie Goldfinger, was the Ford Mustang's second appearance in a feature film and timed with the car's introduction in the US marketplace.
 The song "Mustang Sally", recorded by Wilson Pickett in 1966, is about a man who buys a Mustang for his ungrateful girlfriend. It has been described by one cultural historian as "free advertising for the Ford Motor Company."
 The TV series The F.B.I. was sponsored by Ford Motor Company. Efrem Zimbalist Jr. drove new Mustang convertibles during the first four seasons (1965–1969), and viewers can see how the Mustang evolved into a muscle car.
 Using real cars, Steve McQueen drove a debadged, Highland Green, 1968 Mustang GT fastback with a 390 cubic inch engine and 4 speed transmission in a chase scene with a 1968 black Dodge Charger in the 1968 film Bullitt.
 A 1971 Mustang Mach 1 was featured in the James Bond film, Diamonds Are Forever (1971).
 A 1971 Mustang (modified to look like a 1973 model), nicknamed "Eleanor", was the feature car in the 1974 car heist film Gone in 60 Seconds. "Eleanor" returned, as a 1967 Mustang GT 500, in the movie's remake in 2000.
 The racing video game Ford Mustang: The Legend Lives, released in 2005, features only Mustangs.
 The 1997–1998 TV show Team Knight Rider featured a red 1997 Ford Mustang convertible named "Domino" and the 2008 TV movie Knight Rider featured a black 2008 Ford Mustang Shelby GT500KR as KITT.
 The David Gelb directed documentary A Faster Horse covers the creation of the 2015 Mustang.
 The 2014 film Need for Speed features, along with a Shelby Mustang integral to the plot, a 2015 Mustang which briefly appears at the end. Like with Goldfinger, the scene was shot before the car was revealed to the public. A prototype was used and kept secret.

See also 
 Ford Mustang variants
 California Special Mustang
 Ford Mustang SSP
 Ford Mustang Mach-E

References

Citations

Cited sources

Further reading

External links 

 
 

 
Cars introduced in 1964
1970s cars
1980s cars
1990s cars
2000s cars
2010s cars
2020s cars
2+2 coupés
Pony cars
Coupés
Convertibles
Hatchbacks
Rear-wheel-drive vehicles
Euro NCAP roadster sports cars
Motor vehicles manufactured in the United States